During the 1930-31 Foot-Ball Club Juventus played in Serie A and Mitropa Cup.

Summary 
The team competed in its second Serie A with sole group format, and clinched  the  title. The club replaced Scottish coach Billy Aitken with former Italian National Team manager Carlo Carcano introducing Metodo tactic (2-3-2-3) with the defenders trio Combi-Rosetta-Caligaris (one of all-time best defenders line up).

The club renforced the block with Alfredo Bodoira and Umberto Ghibaudo. In midfield arrived Argentinean Eugenio Castellucci, also Francesco Rier and Aldo Vollono, on attack from Argentina José Maglio along with Giovanni Ferrari, Gilberto Pogliano et Giovanni Vecchina.

Squad

Competitions

Serie A

League table

Matches

Mitropa Cup

Quarterfinals

Statistics

Squad statistics

Players statistics

See also 

Carlo F. Chiesa. "Il grande romanzo dello scudetto", from «Calcio 2000» - years 2002 and 2003

References

External links 

Juventus F.C. seasons
Juventus
Italian football championship-winning seasons